Arlington Municipal Airport  is a city-owned public-use airport in Brookings County, South Dakota, United States. It is located two nautical miles (2.3 mi, 3.7 km) north of the central business district of Arlington, a city in Brookings and Kingsbury counties.

Facilities and aircraft 
It has two runways with turf surfaces:
14/32 is 3,000 by 250 feet (914 x 76 m) and 4/22 is 2,400 by 250 feet (732 x 76 m).

For the 12-month period ending July 12, 2010, the airport had 2,000 general aviation aircraft operations, an average of 166 per month. At that time there were seven aircraft based at this airport: 57% single-engine and 43% glider.

References

External links 
 Aerial photo as of 31 August 1991 from USGS The National Map
 

Airports in South Dakota
Buildings and structures in Brookings County, South Dakota
Transportation in Brookings County, South Dakota